Carla Chin  (born 10 May 1966) is a Jamaica-born Canadian footballer who played as a goalkeeper for the Canada women's national soccer team. She was part of the team at the 1995 FIFA Women's World Cup.

References

External links
 / Canada Soccer Hall of Fame
 

1966 births
Living people
Canadian women's soccer players
Canada women's international soccer players
Sportspeople from Kingston, Jamaica
Jamaican emigrants to Canada
Naturalized citizens of Canada
1995 FIFA Women's World Cup players
Women's association football goalkeepers